The Zimbabwe national rugby union team, nicknamed the Sables, represents nation of Zimbabwe in international competition, and is administered by the Zimbabwe Rugby Union. While sides representing the colony of Rhodesia have played as early as 1910, the modern day Zimbabwe rugby team did not play its first test until 1981, against Kenya. Zimbabwe has competed in two World Cups, in 1987 and 1991, in place of South Africa, who were sanctioned by the IRB at the time due to apartheid. Zimbabwe is categorized as Tier 3 Development One, which prioritizes Zimbabwe over other nations due to historical success as well as popularity of rugby in the nation.

During the colonial days, the team had an association with touring British Isles teams, who regularly played matches against them in their tours of South Africa; the earliest tour being in 1910 when Zimbabwe was known as Southern Rhodesia. The side has also played New Zealand on several occasions, the first being in the late 1920s; Zimbabwe is the only non-Tier 1 nation to defeat the All Blacks, as the Southern Rhodesia side defeated New Zealand in 1947.

Zimbabwe currently compete in the Africa Gold Cup, considered the equivalent of the Six Nations in Africa. Zimbabwe have won the competition once, in 2012 Africa Cup, and finished runners up in 2013, 2014, and 2015. Excluding the Springboks, Zimbabwe is one of only 3 nations in Africa to qualify for the Rugby World Cup, the others being Namibia and the Ivory Coast. The Sables maintain fierce rivalries with regional neighbors Namibia and Kenya, as the respective three nations have vied for African supremacy since the 2000s.

History

Pre-internationals (1890–1910)
When the Pioneer Column arrived in Rhodesia from the Cape Province in 1890, it brought with it the country's first rugby players. The oldest clubs in the country, Queens and the Bulawayo Athletic Club, were formed in 1894 in Bulawayo and the Rhodesia Rugby Football Union was founded one year later in 1895.

The first tour by a Rhodesian team to South Africa took place in 1898, and was composed of players from the five biggest clubs in the two major settlements of Bulawayo and Salisbury, today known as Harare.

Southern Rhodesia/Rhodesia era (1910–1979)
A British Lions team played a side called Southern Rhodesia on 30 July 1910 in Bulawayo; the British Isles team defeated Southern Rhodesia. In 1924 a British side played another match against Rhodesia, on 24 July in Salisbury, the British won 24 to 11. With this, this was the first formal national side to represent the country. On 14 July 1928, Rhodesia played in Bulawayo against New Zealand, losing 8 to 44.

During their 1938 tour to South Africa, the British Lions played two matches against Rhodesia. The first, taking place on 20 July saw the British win 25 to 11; three days later the British won again, 45 to 11; these matches were played in Salisbury and Bulawayo. The 1949 Rhodesian Rugby team, led by John Morkel, famously beat a touring All Blacks side led by Fred Allen in Bulawayo 10-8 on 27 July 1949. Three days later they drew with the mighty All Blacks in Salisbury 3-3. Allen had infamously told his team that, no matter the circumstance, the team would not complain about touring conditions, as he felt whinging would not change the result on the pitch. In spite of this pact, the team encountered a number of issues which were not voiced properly, including the traveling ship being too small, long travel routes, Māori players being left behind due to racial codes, issues with coaching and not acclimating properly to the heat and conditions.

In 1960, New Zealand returned to play a match on 2 July at Glamis Park, with Rhodesia losing 14 to 29, though gave the All Blacks a scare yet again, with the game being tied 6 all by half time. The 1962 tour of South Africa by the British Lions had Rhodesia as the opening fixture on the tour. The opening game of the Lions tour saw the visitors win in Bulawayo, beating Rhodesia 38 to 9 on 26 May. The next tour, in 1962, the Lions won in Salisbury, beating the side 32 to 6. In 1973 Rhodesia played a one-off match against Italy, winning 42 to 4. In 1970, Rhodesia played New Zealand for the last time on 27 July, losing 14 to 27. Overall, Rhodesia had played New Zealand 5 times, winning once and drawing once. In 1974, the Lions were back at Salisbury where they defeated Rhodesia 42 to 6. During the 1960s and 1970s, a number of players born in Rhodesia were capped for other international sides, such as Gary Teichmann, David Curtis, and Bobby Skinstad. Rhodesia's rugby playing strength reached its peak in the early to mid-1970s seasons when the country possessed 49 clubs, putting together 102 teams.

Record against Tier One nations prior to 1980

Zimbabwe era (1980–present)

1980s and 1990s - The Golden Generation
In 1980, the Rhodesia Rugby Football Union was renamed the Zimbabwe Rugby Union, reflecting the end of white minority rule in Zimbabwe, and the beginning of the new state. Previously, the Rhodesia side was exclusively all-white, in contrast to the East Africa Tuskers which had been integrated. However, the new Zimbabwe side was instead integrated, including both black and white players. A tour to England was undertaken that year playing six matches, the first against Surrey at Twickenham and one of the others being against Gloucestershire at Kingsholm on 1 October. That same year, the ZRU severed all its ties to the South African Rugby Board due to mounting pressure to boycott the apartheid regime; while Zimbabwe gained international acceptance as a rugby side, they no longer had teams in the Currie Cup and other South African competitions.

They played their first international game as Zimbabwe on 7 July 1981 against Kenya, winning 34 to 24. Throughout the 1980s, Zimbabwe played a variety of opponents and enjoyed a decent amount of success, defeating opponents such as Spain and the Soviet Union; in the victory over the Soviet Union, history was made as Richard Tsimba became the first black player for Zimbabwe. In 1987, Zimbabwe was invited to partake in the inaugural 1987 Rugby World Cup to represent the African continent, instead of South Africa, who were under sanction due to apartheid; unfortunately, the Sables lost all 3 of their matches, although came on the verge of upsetting Romania (losing by 1 point), a game which featured a two try performance by Richard Tsimba. The following year in 1988, Zimbabwe became one of the charter members of Rugby Africa, alongside the Ivory Coast, Morocco and Tunisia.

In 1990, Zimbabwe participated in the first Rugby World Cup qualifying competition for the African continent. The team topped a group consisting of the Ivory Coast, Morocco, and Tunisia, qualifying for the 1991 Rugby World Cup. However, unfortunately for the Sables, they lost all their 3 matches to Ireland, Japan, and Scotland by fairly large margins. After this World many players from Zimbabwe's "Golden Generation" retired. Namibia and later Kenya entered the scene, challenging the original four charter members of Rugby Africa, and the slow deterioration of the Zimbabwean economy in the 1990s and into the 2000s caused many rugby players (both black and white) to leave the country for opportunities elsewhere. An example of this is Kennedy Tsimba, who initially played as a Zimbabwe international, but later switched to South Africa due to the political and economic situation.

Zimbabwe finished last in the round robin for the 1995 Rugby World Cup, and finished third in the 1999 qualifying round robin.

2000s - Decline 
The Sables began the decade in poor form, losing all four of their matches in the 2000 Africa Cup, against Namibia and a South African Amateur XV; the team narrowly improved in the following edition in 2001, being able to defeat Namibia once by the score of 27 to 26. In the penultimate 2002 edition, Zimbabwe played a close and tense game against Namibia in Harare, but ultimately lost 30 to 42, failing to qualify for the 2003 Rugby World Cup.

As the decade continued, Zimbabwe slowly faded from the African rugby scene; the 2004 campaign was disastrous, as Zimbabwe lost to Madagascar for the first time, and were later thrashed by Namibia. The 2007 Rugby World Cup qualifying campaign was also a disaster, with Zimbabwe losing to Zambia, an opponent they had traditionally dominated. By 2008, the Sables hit rock bottom, losing in the first round of the qualifying for the 2011 World Cup.

2010s - Revival 
The 2010s began with hope for Zimbabwe. The Sables won the Africa Cup for the first time in 2010, beating Botswana and Madagascar. The following year, after a reform of the Africa Cup divisions, Zimbabwe were placed in Group 1B, alongside familiar foes the Ivory Coast and Madagascar and Uganda. Zimbabwe won the division, defeating both Madagascar and Uganda.

As with many other sports, over the years, numerous talented young Zimbabwean rugby players have emigrated to play for other nations, mainly South Africa but also Australia, Scotland and other European countries. This trend has continued with players being attracted abroad by better playing and coaching facilities, as well as being pushed by the ever-declining economic climate in their country of origin.

Notable players 
Over the years, Zimbabwe have lost much of their rugby talent to other countries. The list of Zimbabwean players who have left to ply their trade elsewhere includes:

Don Armand - England, Stormers & Exeter Chiefs flanker
Tonderai Chavhanga - Springbok, Stormers, Sharks, Lions & Newport Dragons winger. Scored a record 6 tries on international debut for South Africa
Lovejoy Chawatama - London Irish prop
David Curtis - Ireland centre, father of Angus Curtis
Angus Curtis - Ulster & Irish U20 flyhalf/centre
David Denton - Scotland, Edinburgh, Bath, Worcester & Leicester Tigers flanker/eighthman
Pieter Dixon - Bath & Stormers hooker
Thom Evans - Glasgow Warriors, London Wasps & Scotland winger/fullback. Cousin of Kai Horstmann
Dave Ewers - Exeter Chiefs flanker
Adrian Garvey - Springbok prop, also represented Zimbabwe
Kyle Godwin - Wallaby, Western Force, Brumbies & Connacht centre
Scott Gray - Scotland, Bath & Northampton flanker
Kai Horstmann - England 7's, Worcester, Harlequins & Exeter Chiefs flanker/eighthman. Cousin of Thom Evans
Marco Mama - Bristol, Worcester Captain & Zimbabwe U20 flanker/eighthman
Andy Marinos - Wales centre, CEO of SANZAAR & Rugby Australia
Nils Mordt - Saracens, London Irish, Harlequins, Northampton Saints & England 7s. Nephew of Ray Mordt.
Ray Mordt - Springbok winger who was the first Springbok to score a hatrick of tries against the All Blacks. Uncle of Nils Mordt
Tendai Mtawarira - Springbok & Sharks & 2019 Rugby World Cup winning prop
Brian Mujati - Springbok, Sale Sharks, Racing 92, Ospreys, Stormers & Lions prop
Sebastian Negri - Italy & Benetton Treviso flanker
Takudzwa Ngwenya - USA & Biarritz winger, who famously scored the try of the 2007 Rugby World Cup, rounding Bryan Habana in the process
David Pocock - Wallaby captain, Western Force & Brumbies flanker/eighthman. 3x nominated for Rugby Player of the year.
Bobby Skinstad - Springbok Captain, Sharks, Stormers & Lions & eighthman who won the 2007 World Cup
David Smith - Springbok centre
Eli Snyman - Leicester Tigers, Blue Bulls, Benetton Treviso & Springbok U20 lock
Gary Teichmann - Springbok Captain & eighthman
Des van Jaarsveldt - Springboks and Rhodesia captain
Mike Williams - Leicester, Worcester & Bath lock/flanker

Former Saracens CEO, Bath Chairman & SA Rugby CEO (whilst triumphant in the 1995 World Cup), Edward Griffiths was born in Zimbabwe.

Other players of Zimbabwean origin include All Black centre Braydon Ennor, Springbok scrumhalf Ross Cronje and Japan winger Kotaro Matsushima

Many other Zimbabwe-born players are playing at top levels in New Zealand, South Africa, Wales, England, Scotland, Ireland and across Europe.

Record
Zimbabwe record against all nations, updated to 1 July 2022, is as follows:

World Cup Record

Players

Current squad
On the 13th of June, the following 31 players were called up to face the Netherlands in a World Rugby test match as well as to participate in the 2023 Rugby World Cup Africa 1 qualifier tournament.

Head Coach:  Brendon Dawson
 Caps Updated: 14 June 2022

Zimbabwe Goshawks

The following players were included in the Zimbabwe Goshawks squad for the 2022 Currie Cup First Division:

Past Coaches
Since the 1987

See also
 Zimbabwe Rugby Union
 Zimbabwe at the Rugby World Cup
 Zimbabwe national rugby sevens team
 Africa Cup

References
Notes

Sources

 About ZRU Zimbabwe Rugby Union Retrieved 17 February 2006.
 Rhodesia profile RugbyData Retrieved 17 February 2006.
 Zimbabwe profile RugbyData Retrieved 17 February 2006.
 Lions timeline LionsRugby Retrieved 18 February 2006.

External links
 Zimbabwe Rugby
 Zimbabwe at IRB
 RWC 2007 Fixtures / Results

 
Rugby union in Zimbabwe
African national rugby union teams